Acianthera denticulata is a species of orchid plant native to Cuba .

References 

denticulata
Orchids of Cuba
Taxa named by Alfred Cogniaux